UFO Magazine was a British magazine devoted to the subject of unidentified flying objects (UFOs) and extraterrestrial life. It was founded in 1981 by brothers Graham Birdsall and Mark Birdsall of Leeds, Yorkshire. The magazine was one of the success stories of ufology, with an international reputation for quality and a peak circulation of 35,000.

Graham Birdsall died from a brain haemorrhage on 19 September 2003. He left behind his wife Christine, daughters Helen and Louise, granddaughter Katy, brother Mark and son-in-law Russel. The editor's job was taken over for a few months by Graham's son-in-law Russel Callaghan, but UFO Magazine eventually ceased publication in March 2004.

The void left by UFO Magazine has been filled to some extent by the newly produced UFO Data magazine referred to as the 'UFO Data Report' and Gary Heseltine's UFO Monthly Magazine.

See also
 List of magazines of anomalous phenomena
 UFO Magazine (US version)

References

External links
 FSR

1981 establishments in the United Kingdom
2004 disestablishments in the United Kingdom
Magazines established in 1981
Magazines disestablished in 2004
Mass media in Leeds
Paranormal magazines
UFO-related literature